Agim Nesho (born in 1956) is an Albanian American diplomat, author, and political analyst. He served as Permanent Representative of Albania to the United Nations between 1996 and 2005, and Ambassador to the United States from 2005 to 2006.

Biography
Nesho was born in Tirana, Albania.

He served as the 10th Permanent Representative of Albania to the United Nations between 1996 and 2005. Nesho then served as ambassador to the United States from 2005 to 2006.

References 

 

Living people
1956 births
Permanent Representatives of Albania to the United Nations
Ambassadors of Albania to the United States
People from Tirana